Mathias Erik Tjärnqvist (born April 15, 1979, in Umeå, Sweden) is a former professional ice hockey forward. His older brother, Daniel Tjärnqvist, was a defenceman for Djurgårdens IF. He currently serves as an assistant coach for Malmö Redhawks in the SHL.

Playing career
Tjärnqvist was drafted by the Dallas Stars with the 96th overall, third round pick in the 1999 NHL Entry Draft. During the 2004–05 NHL lockout, Tjärnqvist played with HV 71 in the Elitserien along with fellow NHL'ers Manny Malhotra, Jonathan Cheechoo, and Bryan McCabe. On February 12, 2007, he was traded to the Phoenix Coyotes, along with a first round pick in the 2007 NHL Entry Draft, for Ladislav Nagy. In 2017 Tjärnqvist officially announced his retirement.

Career statistics

Regular season and playoffs

International

See also
Notable families in the NHL

References

External links

1979 births
Dallas Stars draft picks
Dallas Stars players
Djurgårdens IF Hockey players
HV71 players
Iowa Stars players
Living people
Sportspeople from Umeå
Phoenix Coyotes players
Rögle BK players
Swedish ice hockey right wingers
Swedish expatriate ice hockey players in the United States
Utah Grizzlies (AHL) players